Doddridge County High School is a public secondary school near West Union, West Virginia.

The school, which serves grades 9–12, is a part of Doddridge County Schools.

The school serves the entire county of Doddridge and was created in 1933 when the newly instituted county school system consolidated Carr High School and West Union High School. The school principal is Scott Cochran and the vice principal is Karla Ezell. The school colors are green & white and their mascot is the bulldog.

References

1933 establishments in West Virginia
Educational institutions established in 1933
Public high schools in West Virginia
Schools in Doddridge County, West Virginia